Patriotas de Córdoba was Mexican football club that played in the Liga Premier. The club was based in Córdoba, Veracruz.

History
 Patriotas de Cordoba was founded in 2009 by Rafael Lavín Levet  and the club takes its name after the Patriots that started the Mexican Revolution. The club joined the Tercera División de México in 2009, in that same year the club reached the final against América Manzanillo. The club would go on to earn promotion to the Segunda División Profesional where they currently play.

Players

Current squad

See also
Football in Mexico

External links
Official Club Page

Honors
Tercera División de México (1):2009-10
Third Division Promotion (1):2010

References 

Football clubs in Veracruz
Association football clubs established in 2000
Córdoba, Veracruz